In mathematics, the Grassmannian  is a space that parameterizes all -dimensional linear subspaces of the -dimensional vector space .

When  is a real or complex vector space, Grassmannians are compact smooth manifolds.  In general they have the structure of a smooth algebraic variety, of dimension 

Hermann Grassmann later introduced the concept in general.

Motivation
By giving a collection of subspaces of some vector space a topological structure, it is possible to talk about a continuous choice of subspace or open and closed collections of subspaces; by giving them the structure of a  differential manifold one can talk about smooth choices of subspace.

A natural example comes from tangent bundles of smooth manifolds embedded in Euclidean space. This idea is very similar to the Gauss map for surfaces in a 3-dimensional space.)

We then find that the properties of our vector bundles are related to the properties of the corresponding maps viewed as continuous maps. In particular we find that vector bundles inducing homotopic maps to the Grassmannian are isomorphic. Here the definition of homotopic relies on a notion of continuity, and hence a topology.

Low dimensions
For , the Grassmannian  is the space of lines through the origin in -space, so it is the same as the projective space of  dimensions.

For , the Grassmannian is the space of all 2-dimensional planes containing the origin.

The geometric definition of the Grassmannian as a set 
Let  be an -dimensional vector space over a field .

The Grassmannian as a differentiable manifold 

Now we define a coordinate atlas. For any  matrix , we can apply elementary column operations to obtain its reduced column echelon form.

The  matrix  determines . Hence we have the following definition:

The choice of homogeneous coordinate matrix  representing the element  does not affect the values of the coordinate matrix  representing  on the coordinate neighbourhood . Moreover, the coordinate matrices  may take arbitrary values, and they define a diffeomorphism from  onto the space of -valued  matrices.

On the overlap

of any two such coordinate neighborhoods, the coordinate matrix values are related by the transition relation

Hence the transition functions are  differentiable, even a quotient of polynomials.

The Grassmannian as a set of orthogonal projections 
An alternative way to define a real or complex Grassmannian as a real manifold is to consider it as an explicit set of orthogonal projections defined by explicit equations of full rank ( problem 5-C). For this choose a positive definite real or Hermitian inner product  on  depending on whether  is real or complex. A -dimensional subspace  now determines a unique orthogonal projection  of rank . Conversely, every projection  of rank  defines a subspace: its image .  Since for a projection the rank equals its trace, we can define the Grassman manifold as an explicit set of projections  

In particular taking  or  this gives completely explicit equations for an embedding of the Grassmannian in the space of matrices  respectively . 

As this defines the Grassmannian as a closed subset of the sphere  this is one way to see that the Grassmannian is compact Hausdorff. Then

The Grassmannian as a homogeneous space 
The quickest way of giving the Grassmannian a geometric structure is to express it as a homogeneous space.

More generally, over a ground field , the group  is an algebraic group, and then this construction shows that the Grassmannian is a non-singular algebraic variety. It follows from the existence of the Plücker embedding that the Grassmannian is complete as an algebraic variety.

Over  or  it also becomes possible to use other groups to make this construction. This gives the description as a homogeneous space
.
If we take  and  one gets the isomorphism

Over , one likewise chooses an Hermitian innerproduct  and the unitary group  acts transitively, and one finds analogously

 

The Grassmannian as a scheme 
In the realm of algebraic geometry, the Grassmannian can be constructed as a scheme by expressing it as a representable functor.

Representable functor
Let  be a quasi-coherent sheaf on a scheme . Fix a positive integer . Then to each -scheme , the Grassmannian functor associates the set of quotient modules of

This functor is representable by a separated -scheme . The latter is projective if  is finitely generated.

By construction, the Grassmannian scheme is compatible with base changes: for any -scheme , we have a canonical isomorphism

Universal family
Since the Grassmannian scheme represents a functor, it comes with a universal object, which is an object of

The quotient homomorphism induces a closed immersion from the projective bundle :

For any morphism of -schemes:

this closed immersion induces a closed immersion

is the set

The Plücker embedding 

The Plücker embedding is a natural embedding of the Grassmannian  into the projectivization of the exterior algebra :

Suppose that  is a -dimensional subspace of the -dimensional vector space .

A different basis for  will give a different wedge product, but the two products will differ only by a non-zero scalar (the determinant of the change of basis matrix). Since the right-hand side takes values in a projective space,  is well-defined.

Plücker coordinates and the Plücker relations 
The Plücker embedding of the Grassmannian satisfies some very simple quadratic relations called the Plücker relations. For any ordered sequence  of  positive  integers, let  be the determinant of the  matrix with columns  . The set  is called the Plücker coordinates of the element  of the Grassmannian (with respect to the basis  of ).

where  denotes the sequence  with the term  omitted. 

In general, however, many more equations are needed to define the Plücker embedding of a Grassmannian in projective space.

The Grassmannian as a real affine algebraic variety 
Let  denote the space of real  matrices. Consider the set of matrices  defined by  if and only if the three conditions are satisfied:

  is a projection operator: .
  is symmetric: .
  has trace : .

Duality 
This gives the natural short exact sequence:

Using the natural isomorphism of a finite-dimensional vector space with its double dual shows that taking the dual again recovers the original short exact sequence. In terms of the Grassmannian, this is a canonical isomorphism

Schubert cells
The detailed study of the Grassmannians uses a decomposition into subsets called Schubert cells, which were first applied in enumerative geometry. The manipulation of Schubert cells is Schubert calculus.

Here is an example of the technique. Fix a -dimensional subspace  and consider the partition of  into those -dimensional subspaces of  that contain  and those that do not. This gives recursive formulas:

Otherwise:

Cohomology ring of the complex Grassmannian
Every point in the complex Grassmannian manifold  defines an -plane in -space. Fibering these planes over the Grassmannian one arrives at the vector bundle  which generalizes the tautological bundle of a projective space. Similarly the -dimensional orthogonal complements of these planes yield an orthogonal vector bundle . In particular, all of the integral cohomology is at even degree as in the case of a projective space.

These generators are subject to a set of relations, which defines the ring. Functoriality of the total Chern classes allows one to write this relation as

The quantum cohomology ring was calculated by Edward Witten in The Verlinde Algebra And The Cohomology Of The Grassmannian.  The generators are identical to those of the classical cohomology ring, but the top relation is changed to

reflecting the existence in the corresponding quantum field theory of an instanton with  fermionic zero-modes which violates the degree of the cohomology corresponding to a state by  units.

Associated measure
Then for a set , define

Since , we have . Moreover,  is a Radon measure with respect to the metric space topology and is uniform in the sense that every ball of the same radius (with respect to this metric) is of the same measure.

Oriented Grassmannian

As a homogeneous space it can be expressed as:

Applications

A key application of Grassmannians is as the "universal" embedding space 
for bundles with connections on compact manifolds.

Solutions of the Kadomtsev–Petviashvili equation can be expressed in terms of abelian group flows on an infinite-dimensional Grassmann manifold. The KP equation, expressed in Hirota bilinear form in terms of the Tau function (integrable systems) is equivalent to the Plücker relations. Positive Grassmann manifolds can be used to express soliton solutions of KP equations which are nonsingular for real values of the KP flow parameters.

Grassmann manifolds have found applications in computer vision tasks of video-based face recognition and shape recognition. They are also used in the data-visualization technique known as the grand tour.

Grassmannians allow the scattering amplitudes of subatomic particles to be calculated via a positive Grassmannian construct called the amplituhedron.

See also
Schubert calculus
For an example of the use of Grassmannians in differential geometry, see Gauss map and in projective geometry, see Plücker co-ordinates.
Flag manifolds are generalizations of Grassmannians and Stiefel manifolds are closely related.
Given a distinguished class of subspaces, one can define Grassmannians of these subspaces, such as the Lagrangian Grassmannian.
Grassmannians provide classifying spaces in K-theory, notably the classifying space for U(n). In the homotopy theory of schemes, the Grassmannian plays a similar role for algebraic K-theory.
Affine Grassmannian
Grassmann bundle
Grassmann graph

Further reading
A Grassmann Manifold Handbook: Basic Geometry and Computational Aspects, Zimmermann, Bendokat and Absil.

Notes

References
  section 1.2
  see chapters 5–7
 
 

 
 

Differential geometry
Projective geometry
Algebraic homogeneous spaces
Algebraic geometry